The Mount Helena Tavern was opened in 1902 in Mount Helena, a hills suburb of Perth, Western Australia. It was originally called the Lion Mill Hotel, then the Mount Helena Hotel, before acquiring its current name. Locally it is referred to as The Mounties.

History
In 1882 Mount Helena began as White's Mill. The timber mill was established to provide sleepers for the Eastern Railway that linked Guildford to Chidlow's Well. White's Mill closed in 1888 and was replaced by Lion Mill.

Due to logging and the junction of two railway lines, Ernest Forsyth built and licensed a hotel. The original weatherboard Lion Mill Hotel was built by local carpenters and completed in September 1902. The land and finance for the hotel came from local timber mill owner Richard Hummerston.

After opening the tavern, the license was transferred months later to Frederick Foweraker in December 1902.

Foweraker and his wife also served as the local ambulance, administering first aid to the serious injuries that occurred in the local sawmills. The townspeople raised money to obtain an ambulance chest for them and have the Foweraker's run first aid classes for local people.

Since opening, the Tavern served as a meeting place for those living in or visiting the district, hosting dances and public meetings. It also hosts local cricket and football teams, politicians and even log chopping competitions.

In 1908 Mitchell Graham became licensee and in 1909 was charged and found guilty with watering his whisky.

In July 1910 The Sunday Times newspaper described the Tavern as "a dirty drinking den… card-playing is encouraged by the management on Sunday and Monday alike, and other inducements held out to the mills hands to invest their wages in lashings of booze, to the consequent loss and disgust of those dependent upon them." This description was strongly refuted in the next publication. In August 1910 the premier Sir Newton Moore was entertained at the tavern by the members of the local Roads Board.

The tavern has changed hands many times over the years and licensees have included Thomas Radley, Ethel Bullen, Cornelius Sheahan, Stan O'Grady, William Harburn, and Murray Collins.

During the First World War route marches were conducted by the Australian Army from Blackboy Hill training camp in Greenmount to the hotel, and the hotel provided entertainments for returning wounded soldiers.

The town was renamed Mount Helena in 1924 and industry changed from saw mills to fruit growers and poultry farmers. In 1925 the tavern changed name from the Lion Mill Hotel to the Mount Helena Hotel.

In 1940 Bernard McGrath was charged with the unlawful killing of Arthur Tilbrook after a fight in the carpark of the Tavern. After a four-day trial McGrath was found not guilty of the crime.

Architectural character
The Mount Helena Tavern is a single story, iron roofed, weatherboard building adjacent to the Railway Reserve Heritage Trail. The building has a rambling feel, having been added to at various times along with enclosures of verandas and porches, but retains a charm and expression of the turn of the century period when it was originally built. Internally the tavern has been modified and several walls removed however much of the original fabric remains.

Heritage value
The Mount Helena Tavern has very high aesthetic, social and historic significance for the Mount Helena community and the community's contribution to the development of Perth through its timber and fruit growing industry.

In 2016 the Mount Helena Tavern was listed on Western Australia's Heritage Register for the contribution made by the place to Western Australia's social heritage.

References

External links
 

Shire of Mundaring
Hotels in Western Australia
Heritage hotels in Australia
Australian companies established in 1902
Hotels established in 1902